Oak Lawn may refer to:

United States
Oak Lawn, Illinois, a suburb southwest of Chicago, Illinois
Oak Lawn (Ridgely, Maryland), listed on the NRHP
Oak Lawn (Huntsboro, North Carolina), listed on the NRHP
Oak Lawn, Dallas, Texas, a neighborhood
Oak Lawn (Charlottesville, Virginia), a historic home
Oak Lawn (Madison Heights, Virginia), a historic home
Oak Lawn (Washington, D.C.), a former estate and home